is a railway station on the Yamada Line in the city of Miyako, Iwate, Japan, operated by East Japan Railway Company (JR East).

Lines
Haratai Station is served by the Yamada Line, and is located 82.6 rail kilometers from the terminus of the line at Morioka Station.

Station layout
Haratai Station has a single side platform serving a single bidirectional track. There is no longer a station building, but only a waiting room built on the platform. The station is unattended.

History
Haratai Station opened on 6 November 1934. The station was closed from 26 November 1946 to 21 November 1954. The station was absorbed into the JR East network upon the privatization of the Japanese National Railways (JNR) on 1 April 1987.

Surrounding area
  Japan National Route 106

See also
 List of railway stations in Japan

References

External links

  

Railway stations in Iwate Prefecture
Yamada Line (JR East)
Railway stations in Japan opened in 1934
Miyako, Iwate
Stations of East Japan Railway Company